Timothy Adam North Payne (born 29 April 1979 in Swindon) is a former English rugby union footballer who played at prop for London Wasps.

Club career
Payne started his playing career as a child at Painswick RFC-  the oldest village rugby club in England. He then moved to senior rugby at Stroud RFC. Payne has previously played for Coventry R.F.C., Bristol Shoguns and Cardiff RFC. He joined London Wasps in 2003 and was a member of the side that won the Heineken Cup in his first season. Payne has played in three Guinness Premiership finals in 2004, 2005 and 2008, winning them all.

International career
Payne was selected for the 2004 Summer tour, making his debut against Australia. His next two caps came on the 2006 Summer tour, again against the Wallabies.

Payne featured for England in the 2007 Six Nations, 2008 Six Nations and 2010 Six Nations.

He was called into the squad for the 2009 British & Irish Lions tour. He did not feature in a Test match but did start against the Emerging Springboks.

References

External links 
Wasps profile
Bristol profile
England profile
Player statistics from scrum.com

1979 births
Living people
Alumni of the Royal Agricultural University
Alumni of the University of Bristol
Bristol Bears players
British & Irish Lions rugby union players from England
Cardiff RFC players
Coventry R.F.C. players
England international rugby union players
English rugby union players
Rugby union players from Swindon
Rugby union props
Wasps RFC players